Cooper Teare (born August 18, 1999) is an American distance runner who races events such as the 1500m, 3000m, 5000m, As a runner at the University of Oregon, he won the 5000m in 13:12.27 at the 2021 NCAA Division I Outdoor Track and Field Championships. This time was a school record, championship record, Olympic standard qualifying time, and the fastest performance ever by an American collegiate runner.  Teare also was a part of a team that won the distance medley relay at the 2021 NCAA Division I Indoor Track Championships to help lead Oregon to a national team title.  In addition, Teare is the collegiate record holder in both the indoor mile and distance medley relay.  Teare finished 10th in the 1500 m and 5000 m at the 2018 IAAF World U20 Championships in Tampere, Finland.

Teare finished 4th in the 5000 m in the 2020 United States Olympic Trials in 13:28.08, narrowly missing making the US Olympic team by less than one second.

Teare announced he had signed a professional contract with Nike via his Instagram on December 2, 2021. In 2022, Teare joined the Bowerman Track Club.

Running Career
High School

Teare attended St. Joseph Notre Dame High School in Alameda, California. In 2015 he won the California Interscholastic Federation State Cross Country Championships. In 2016 he was the California State Champion in the 3,200m, winning with a then personal-best time of 8:51.85. During his senior year he won the Mt SAC Relays invitational high school mile in 4:00.16 to become the fifth fastest U.S. boy in a high school-only competition. Teare was honored as the 2016 East Bay Times Boys Track and Field Athlete of the Year.

College

Teare competed at the University of Oregon where he was a finalist for the Bowerman Award. 

Career Highlights 
 NCAA Collegiate Record Holder : 1 Mile
 NCAA Collegiate DMR Record // with Charlie Hunter, Cole Hocker & Luis Peralta
 NCAA Outdoor Championships Record Holder // 5000M
NCAA Championship Results

Professional career 
On January 29, 2022, Teare made his professional debut at the Millrose Games, where he competed in the Dr. Sander Men's 3000m. He ran a time of 7:39.61, finishing 0.11 seconds behind first-place winner Geordie Beamish to take second place.

On February 11, 2022, Cooper Teare attempted to break the American indoor mile record with his former teammate Cole Hocker at The Badgers Windy City Invitational. Teare edged out Hocker with a time of 3:50.17 which was a new personal record. However, his time narrowly missed the American record by a mere 0.19 seconds. In the same meet on the next day, Teare ran a 1:47.48 800m which was a new personal record.

On March 19, 2022, Teare ran the 5000m Invitational at the Cardinal Classic alongside Cole Hocker. Once again, he beat Cole Hocker in this race and ran a new personal record of 13:06.73 which was also a World Qualifying time.

On June 25, 2022, Teare won the 1500m at the USA Track and Field Championships  with a time of 3:45.86 at Hayward Field in Eugene. It is Teare’s first individual national championship title, and qualified him for the World Championships, also to be held at Eugene.

References

External links
 University of Oregon bio: Cooper Teare
 World Athletics profile
 Pace the Nation 2022 Interview with Cooper Teare
 

1999 births
Living people
American male long-distance runners
Oregon Ducks men's track and field athletes
Place of birth missing (living people)
Sportspeople from Alameda, California
Track and field athletes from California